Renfrew West and Inverclyde was a constituency of the House of Commons of the Parliament of the United Kingdom from 1983 to 1997.

The constituency was created out of, and merged back into, the West Renfrewshire constituency.

Boundaries
The Renfrew District electoral divisions of Bargarran and Gryffe, and the Inverclyde District wards of Cardwell Bay, Firth, Gourock, and Kilmacolm.

Members of Parliament

Politics and history of the constituency

Election results

Elections of the 1980s

Elections of the 1990s

References 

Historic parliamentary constituencies in Scotland (Westminster)
Constituencies of the Parliament of the United Kingdom established in 1983
Constituencies of the Parliament of the United Kingdom disestablished in 1997
Politics of Renfrewshire
Politics of Inverclyde
Gourock